A Ward is a smallest unit of Local government in Nepal. The local level body (Gaunpalika and Municipality) which is divided into 753 units, are further divided into 6,743 Wards. These wards were previously either a single VDC or a part of VDC. A local level unit is divided into minimum 5 wards or maximum 33 wards.

No. of wards (district and province wise)

References

See also
List of gaunpalikas of Nepal
List of cities in Nepal
Local government in Nepal
Subdivisions of Nepal
Lists of subdivisions of Nepal
Wards and electoral divisions of Nepal